Shane Mackley is an Australian former professional rugby league footballer who played in the 1990s. He played for the Newcastle Knights in 1992.

External links
Statistics at rugbyleagueproject.org

Living people
Australian rugby league players
Newcastle Knights players
Rugby league centres
Rugby league wingers
Year of birth missing (living people)
Place of birth missing (living people)